Harry Brod (February 1, 1951 – June 16, 2017) was a professor of sociology at University of Northern Iowa.

Education 
He held a PhD in Philosophy, 1981, from the University of California, San Diego.

Men's studies
Brod was one of the first academics to specialize in men's studies.  Brod became interested in the men's movement in the mid-1960s, as he thought about society's expectations of individuals based on their gender.

About 1980, while working on his doctorate at the University of California, San Diego, Brod attended a weekend retreat called the California Men's Gathering.  While eating breakfast, he witnessed an argument between two men.  One man complained that the discussions were not sufficiently focused on women's issues. The other man said the retreat was about men's emotional and personal needs, and that men should not feel guilty about their power and position in society.  After listening to the arguments, Brod decided to devote much of his life to "showing people that damage to men's psyches is the result of the power we have over everyone else."

Kenyon College
Brod was hired as interim director of the new Women’s and Gender Studies Department at Kenyon College in the early 1990s. Despite being assured during the hiring process that his gender was not an issue, the appointment of a man was very controversial.

Publications

Author

Editor

Book chapters

References

External links
Official website. 

1951 births
2017 deaths
Jewish American academics
Men and masculinities scholars
University of California, San Diego alumni
University of Northern Iowa faculty
 Kenyon College faculty